Catharina Clasina "Rini" Dobber (born 1 January 1943) is a retired Dutch swimmer. She competed at the 1960 Summer Olympics in the 100 m backstroke, but failed to reach the final. Dobber set three national backstroke records in 1959–1960.

External links

 Rini Dobber. sports-reference.com
 100 meter rugslag, 
 200 meter rugslag. zwemmenindepolder.nl

1943 births
Living people
Dutch female backstroke swimmers
Olympic swimmers of the Netherlands
Swimmers at the 1960 Summer Olympics
Swimmers from Amsterdam
20th-century Dutch women